Bruno Rangel Domingues (11 December 1981 – 28 November 2016) was a Brazilian footballer who played as a striker.

Rangel was one of the victims when LaMia Airlines Flight 2933 crashed on 28 November 2016.

Club career
Born in Campos dos Goytacazes, Rio de Janeiro, Rangel started playing as a senior for hometown club Goytacaz in 2002. In 2004, he moved to cross-town rivals Americano, but was rarely used at the club. After leaving the club in 2006, he worked as a general assistant for Caixa Econômica Federal before joining Ananindeua.

On 16 December 2006 Rangel renewed with the club, and subsequently represented Angra dos Reis, Macaé, Bonsucesso and Baraúnas before returning to Pará in 2009, with Águia de Marabá. After being the latter's top goalscorer in 2009 Série C with six goals in only seven matches, he signed for Paysandu on 1 December 2009.

On 23 December 2010, Rangel moved to Guarani also in the third division. He rescinded with the club the following 26 July, and agreed to a contract with Joinville just hours later. Released in June 2011, he subsequently joined Metropolitano.

In 2013, Rangel signed for Chapecoense. He also became a prolific striker during his first season at the club, scoring a career-best 31 goals in only 34 league matches; his side also achieved promotion to Série A. On 9 January of the following year he moved abroad for the first time in his career, joining Qatar Stars League side Al-Arabi SC.

After appearing rarely, Rangel returned to Chape on 1 June 2014. He made his return to the field on 19 July, in a 1–0 away win against São Paulo, and scored his first goal on 30 August in a 2–4 loss at Cruzeiro.

On 26 July 2015, Rangel scored all his team's goals in a 2–1 home win against Fluminense. He repeated the feat on 28 October, in a Copa Sudamericana home success over River Plate, but it was not enough to ensure qualification to the following round. On 12 December 2015, he renewed his contract for a further year.

Rangel finished the 2016 Campeonato Catarinense as both champion and top goalscorer, with ten goals under his name; during the tournament he became Chape's biggest goalscorer, surpassing Índio. On 1 June 2016 he scored a hat-trick in a 4–3 away win against Coritiba, and reached his 80th goal for the club on 7 September in a 2–2 draw against Santa Cruz, through a penalty kick.

On 29 October 2016, again from the spot, Rangel scored his last goal as a footballer, in a 1–1 away draw against Corinthians.

Death
On 28 November 2016, whilst at the service of Chapecoense, Rangel was among the fatalities of the LaMia Airlines Flight 2933 accident in the Colombian village of Cerro Gordo, La Unión, Antioquia.

Career statistics

Honours

Club
Paysandu
Campeonato Paraense: 2010

Joinville
Campeonato Brasileiro Série C: 2011

Chapecoense
 Campeonato Catarinense: 2016
 Copa Sudamericana: 2016 (posthumously)

Individual
Campeonato Catarinense top goalscorer: 2016
Top goalscorer for Chapecoense in official competitions: 77 goals
Top goalscorer for Chapecoense overall: 81 goals

References

External links

1981 births
2016 deaths
People from Campos dos Goytacazes
Brazilian footballers
Association football forwards
Campeonato Brasileiro Série A players
Campeonato Brasileiro Série B players
Campeonato Brasileiro Série C players
Campeonato Brasileiro Série D players
Goytacaz Futebol Clube players
Americano Futebol Clube players
Macaé Esporte Futebol Clube players
Bonsucesso Futebol Clube players
Águia de Marabá Futebol Clube players
Paysandu Sport Club players
Guarani FC players
Joinville Esporte Clube players
Clube Atlético Metropolitano players
Associação Chapecoense de Futebol players
Qatar Stars League players
Al-Arabi SC (Qatar) players
Brazilian expatriate footballers
Brazilian expatriate sportspeople in Qatar
Expatriate footballers in Qatar
Footballers killed in the LaMia Flight 2933 crash
Sportspeople from Rio de Janeiro (state)